Rough & Ready, Vol. 1 is a studio album released by Shabba Ranks. After his previous album, As Raw as Ever, received positive reviews, his good spell continued as Rough & Ready, Vol. 1 likewise received positive reviews and enjoyed some commercial success, reaching #71 in the UK and #82 in Germany.

"Mr. Loverman" also appeared on the Deep Cover soundtrack.

Track listing

References

1992 albums
Shabba Ranks albums
Albums produced by K-Def
Epic Records albums